Kill the Wolf may refer to:

Kill the Wolf (Matt Berry album)
Kill the Wolf (B. Dolan album)